Zub Lake is a lake about  long, lying  east-southeast of Tsentral'naya Hill in the Schirmacher Hills, Queen Maud Land. The feature was mapped by the Soviet Antarctic Expedition in 1961 and named "Ozero Zub" (tooth lake), presumably for its shape when viewed in plan.

Lakes of Queen Maud Land
Princess Astrid Coast